Yi Haeng-ni (Hangul: 이행리, Hanja: 李行里) was the father of Dojo of Joseon, the grandfather of Hwanjo of Joseon and also the great-grandfather of Taejo of Joseon, the founder of the Joseon Dynasty.

After his death, he was given the temple name Ikjo (익조, 翼祖) by his great-great-grandson, King Taejong and his tomb was located in Jireung, Anbyeon-gun, Hamgyeongnam-do. Meanwhile, his wife, Queen Jeongsuk was buried in Sukneung, Muncheon-gun, Hamgyeongnam-do.

Family
Father: Mokjo of Joseon (조선 목조, died 1274)
Grandfather: Yi Yang-mu (이양무, died 1231)
Grandmother: Lady, of the Samcheok Yi clan (부인 삼척이씨)
Mother: Queen Hyogong of the Pyeonchang Yi clan (효공왕후 이씨)
Grandfather: Yi Gong-suk (이공숙)
Grandmother: Lady Jeong, Princess Consort Dolsan (돌산군부인 정씨)
Wives and their Children(s):
Lady Son (부인 손씨)
Yi An, Grand Prince Hamnyeong (이안 함녕대군) – also known as Yi Gyu-su (이규수)
Yi Jang, Grand Prince Hamchang (이장 함창대군) – also known as Yi Bok (이복)
Queen Jeongsuk of the Yeongheung Choe clan (정숙왕후 최씨)
Yi Song, Grand Prince Hamwon (이송 함원대군)
Yi Chun (이춘)
Yi Won, Grand Prince Hamcheon (이원 함천대군)
Yi Go-tae, Grand Prince Hamneung (이고태 함릉대군)
Yi Jeon, Grand Prince Hamyang (이전 함양대군)
Yi Eung-geo, Grand Prince Hamseong (이응거 함성대군)
Princess Anui (안의공주) – married Ju-Dan (주단).

References

13th-century Korean people
House of Yi
Year of birth unknown
Date of birth unknown
Year of death unknown
Date of death unknown
Goryeo people